It Always Ends That Way (Italian: Finisce sempre così) is a 1939 Italian musical comedy film directed by Enrique Susini and starring Vittorio De Sica, Nedda Francy and Roberto Rey. The film was based on a novel by Robert Dieudonné. It was shot at the Cinecittà studios in Rome with sets designed by Salvo D'Angelo.

Cast
 Vittorio De Sica as Alberto Miller  
 Nedda Francy as Elisabetta  
 Roberto Rey as Renato  
 Noëlle Norman as Mariza Kalmay  
 Pina Renzi as La signora Kalmay  
 Assia De Busny as Florika  
 Eugenia Zaresca as Daisy 
 Alfredo Robert as Il parrocco  
 Eugenio Duse as Il regista  
 Carlo Chertier as Il critico Feroski 
 Alfredo Bracchi as Il paroliere  
 Ernesto Calindri as Un cameriere  
 Vasco Creti as L'investigatore privato  
 Liana Del Balzo as La cameriera dell' albergo  
 Mario Ersanilli as Un paesano  
 Mimosa Favi as L'amica di Elisabetta  
 Walter Grant as Un padrino  
 Alfredo Martinelli as Il marchese Ignazio Kovacs  
 Giovanni Onorato as Il pianista stonato  
 Alda Perosino as La cameriera 
 Emilio Petacci as Un contadino barbuto 
 Carlo Ranieri as Un anziano paesano 
 Roberto as Un ballerino 
 Gustavo Serena as Janosh, il maggiordomo

References

Bibliography 
 Goble, Alan. The Complete Index to Literary Sources in Film. Walter de Gruyter, 1999.

External links 

1939 films
Italian musical comedy films
1939 musical comedy films
1930s Italian-language films
Films based on French novels
Italian black-and-white films
Films shot at Cinecittà Studios
Minerva Film films
Films set in Budapest
1930s Italian films